Sunnhordlands Kommunistblad was a Norwegian newspaper, published in Stord in Hordaland county.

History and profile
Sunnhordlands Kommunistblad was started on 6 January 1927 as the Communist Party organ in the region Sunnhordland. It was published weekly. However, the party struggled economically and the newspaper went defunct after its last issue on 5 July 1928.

After the Second World War, a short-lived Sunnhordland Arbeiderblad existed.

References

1927 establishments in Norway
1928 disestablishments in Norway
Communist Party of Norway newspapers
Defunct newspapers published in Norway
Mass media in Hordaland
Norwegian-language newspapers
Publications established in 1927
Publications disestablished in 1928
Stord